The Howard Heights are a snow-covered coastal promontory,  high, between Stewart Glacier and Gerry Glacier on the north side of Edward VII Peninsula, Antarctica. Features in this area were explored by the Byrd Antarctic Expeditions, 1928–30 and 1933–35. These heights were mapped by the United States Geological Survey from surveys and U.S. Navy air photos, 1959–65, and were named by the Advisory Committee on Antarctic Names (at the suggestion of Admiral R.E. Byrd) for Roy W. Howard of the Scripps-Howard newspapers, who made financial contributions to the 1933–35 Byrd expedition.

References

Headlands of the Ross Dependency
King Edward VII Land
E. W. Scripps Company